Christopher Plummer (fl. 1490s – 1530s) was a Canon of Windsor from 1513 - 1535. He was attainted and deprived in 1535.

He was of the same family as the writer William Plomer.

Career

He was appointed:
Prebendary of Auckland in Durham 1493
Prebendary of Bole in York Minster 1507
Prebendary of Cadington Major in St Paul’s 1515
Prebendary of Welton Beckhall in Lincoln 1533 - 1534
Prebendary of Somerley in Chichester 1516 - 1534

He was appointed to the fourth stall in St George's Chapel, Windsor Castle in 1513, and held the stall until he was deprived of it in 1535. He was imprisoned in the Tower of London until 1536 when he was granted a pardon of all treasons etc., whereof he is guilty or to which he is accessory against the King and Queen Anne according to Statute 26 Hen. VIII.

Notes 

Canons of Windsor
Prisoners in the Tower of London
15th-century English people
People of the Tudor period
16th-century English people
16th-century English clergy